The Conrad Weiser Area School District is located in western Berks County in the U.S. state of Pennsylvania. A tiny portion extends into Lancaster County. This district serves South Heidelberg Township, Heidelberg Township, North Heidelberg Township and Marion Township and the Boroughs of Wernersville, Robesonia and Womelsdorf. Eight properties in a housing development in West Cocalico in Lancaster County also attend the District's schools. According to 2000 federal census data, it serves a resident population of 23,777. By 2010, the District's population declined to 19,303 people. In 2009, Conrad Weiser Area School District residents’ per capita income was $22,732, while the median family income was $57,488. In the Commonwealth, the median family income was $49,501  and the United States median family income was $49,445, in 2010.

In the 1980s, a small group of Lancaster County property owners in the Cocalico School District were successful in seceding from the district. They formed a small district called Squire Hill Independent School District. The new District was short lived merging with Conrad Weiser Area School District.

Conrad Weiser Area School District operates four schools: Conrad Weiser High School (9th–12th), Conrad Weiser Middle School (5th–8th), Conrad Weiser East Elementary School (K-4th) and Conrad Weiser West Elementary School (K-4th).

The District is named for Conrad Weiser, an important Pennsylvanian in colonial days, especially known as an interpreter and emissary in councils between Native Americans and the colonies, especially Pennsylvania.

Extracurriculars
The District offers a wide variety of clubs, activities and an extensive sports program.

Sports
The District funds:

Boys
Baseball - AAA
Basketball- AAA
Bowling - AAAA
Cross Country - AA
Football - AAA
Golf - AAA
Lacrosse - AAAA
Soccer - AA
Tennis - AAA
Track and Field - AAA
Wrestling	- AAA

Girls
Basketball - AAA
Bowling - AAAA
Cheerleading - AAAA
Cross Country - AA
Field Hockey - AA
Golf - AAA
Lacrosse - AAAA
Soccer (Fall) - AA
Softball - AAA
Girls' Tennis - AAA
Track and Field - AAA
Volleyball - AA

Middle School Sports

Boys
Baseball
Basketball
Cross Country
Football
Soccer
Track and Field
Wrestling	

Girls
Basketball
Cheer
Cross Country
Field Hockey
Soccer (fall)
Softball 
Track and Field
Volleyball

References

School districts in Berks County, Pennsylvania